Pterophorus kuningus is a moth of the family Pterophoridae. It is found in south-east Asia.

References

Moths described in 1997
kuningus